Luke Pavlou is an Australian professional footballer who currently plays as a central midfielder for National Premier Leagues Victoria side Oakleigh Cannons. He made his professional debut on 18 April 2015 for Brisbane Roar FC against Melbourne Victory. After his departure from Brisbane Roar he signed for National Premier Leagues Queensland side Brisbane City FC under Head Coach John Kosmina for the 2016 season.

Following on from his season at Brisbane City, Pavlou signed with National Premier Leagues Victoria giants South Melbourne FC until the end of the 2019 NPL Victoria season. He made 39 league appearances for South Melbourne and featured heavily in their 2017 FFA Cup run which culminated in a 5-2 defeat to the reigning A-League champions, Sydney FC in the semi-final.

On 28 May 2018, NPL Victoria side Oakleigh Cannons announced the signing of Pavlou until the end of the 2018 NPL Victoria season.
Pavlou returned to South Melbourne for the 2020 NPL Victoria Season

References

External links

Living people
Association football midfielders
Australian soccer players
Australian people of Greek descent
Brisbane Roar FC players
A-League Men players
National Premier Leagues players
1996 births